Saltbush Bill's Gamecock is a humorous poem by Australian writer and poet Andrew Barton "Banjo" Paterson. It was first published in Brooks's Australian Xmas Annual Volume 1 1898.

Saltbush Bill was one of Paterson's best known characters who appeared in 5 poems: "Saltbush Bill" (1894),  "Saltbush Bill's Second Fight" (1897), "Saltbush Bill's Gamecock" (1898), "Saltbush Bill on the Patriarchs" (1903), and "Saltbush Bill, J.P." (1905).

Plot summary

Saltbush Bill is again droving his sheep when he happens "on Take 'Em Down, the station of Rooster Hall." Rooster Hall is a follower of cockfighting and Bill challenges him to a contest: his Australian bird against Hall's, a "clipt and a shaven cock, the pride of his English Game". But Bill has a trick up his sleeve and wins the contest by forfeit.

Further publications

 Rio Grande's Last Race and Other Verses by Banjo Paterson (1902)
 Singer of the Bush, A. B. (Banjo) Paterson : Complete Works 1885-1900 edited by Rosamund Campbell and Philippa Harvie (1983)
 A Vision Splendid : The Complete Poetry of A. B. 'Banjo' Paterson (1990)

See also

 1898 in poetry
 1898 in literature
 1898 in Australian literature
 Australian literature

References 

1898 poems
Poetry by Banjo Paterson